Emir Ezequiel Izaguirre Brondi (born 26 January 1995) is an Argentine professional footballer who plays as a forward for Ben Hur.

Career
Izaguirre had a spell in the youth academy of Colón, though Viale FBC were the first senior club of his career - with the forward scoring nine goals in fourteen appearances across 2016 in Torneo Federal B. 2017 saw Izaguirre move across the division to Ben Hur, though he'd leave mid-year after one match after he was signed by Primera División side Atlético Tucumán. He only featured for their reserves, prior to leaving for Torneo Federal A's Unión Aconquija in 2018. He scored his first goal in February versus Deportivo Maipú, who he scored against again in the succeeding March. Unión suffered relegation to tier four in 2017–18.

Izaguirre joined Central Córdoba of Primera B Nacional in June 2018. He made his professional football bow for the Santiago del Estero club on 23 March 2019 during a victory away to Santamarina. Izaguirre was released in June 2019, with the forward subsequently rejoining Ben Hur in the succeeding December.

Career statistics
.

References

External links

1995 births
Living people
People from Paraná Department
Argentine footballers
Association football forwards
Torneo Federal A players
Primera Nacional players
Club Sportivo Ben Hur players
Atlético Tucumán footballers
Central Córdoba de Santiago del Estero footballers
Sportspeople from Entre Ríos Province